František Veselý (7 December 1943, in Prague – 30 October 2009) was a Czech football player. He played on the right wing and was known for his technique. He spent his best football years playing for SK Slavia Prague.

He played for Czechoslovakia, for whom he appeared in 34 matches and scored three goals. He was a participant in the 1970 FIFA World Cup and in the 1976 UEFA European Championship, where Czechoslovakia won the gold medal. In extra time of the semi final of EURO 1976 against the Netherlands, he provided a pass to Zdeněk Nehoda, who scored to give Czechoslovakia a 2–1 lead. He then scored himself as the game finished 3–1 and the team reached the final.

Veselý died of heart failure on 30 October 2009 at the age of 65.

References

External links
 
 Zemřel František Veselý, legendu fotbalu zradilo srdce 

1943 births
2009 deaths
Czechoslovak footballers
Czech footballers
Czechoslovakia international footballers
1970 FIFA World Cup players
UEFA Euro 1976 players
UEFA European Championship-winning players
Footballers from Prague
Austrian Football Bundesliga players
SK Slavia Prague players
Dukla Prague footballers
SK Rapid Wien players
Expatriate footballers in Austria
Czechoslovak expatriate footballers
Czechoslovak expatriate sportspeople in Austria
Association football forwards
First Vienna FC players